The Camactulici were a Gallic tribe dwelling around modern Toulon during the during the Iron Age.

Name 

The Camactulici are solely attested by Pliny as Camactulicorum in the 1st century AD.

Geography 

Pliny describes the territory of the Camactulici as located near Citharista (La Ciotat) and the Suelteri. They appear to have lived in the region of modern Toulon, their territory corresponding to the later pagus Tolonensis of the Early Middle Ages and the Diocese of Toulon.  

According to history Guy Barruol, they were part of the Salluvian confederation.

References

Bibliography 

 

Gauls
Tribes of pre-Roman Gaul
Historical Celtic peoples